Lillian Logan was an American actress based in Britain. She was born in Chicago, and studied as a singer in Milan and Berlin.

Selected filmography
 The Pink Opera Cloak (1913) - Laura Keene
 The House of Temperley (1913)
 Lawyer Quince (1914)
 Her Children (1914)
 Beauty and the Barge (1914)
 Branscombe's Pal (1914)

References

External links
 

Year of birth missing
Year of death missing
American film actresses
American silent film actresses
20th-century American actresses
American expatriates in the United Kingdom
Actresses from Chicago